Top Gear: Dare Devil is a racing video game for the PlayStation 2. It was developed by Papaya Studio and published by Kemco in 2000.

Gameplay
This game consists of single-player and multiplayer. In single-player, the player drives around one of four cities, Rome, London, Tokyo and San Francisco - collecting Dare Devil Coins. If all Coins in a level are collected, the player unlocks a secret car. What also can be collected are keys and wrenches that open up bonus missions. After winning a bonus mission, the player can unlock a paint job for the car used.

The player can also free roam around cities.

There are twelve cars players can drive; names in brackets are those they resemble.
 The Pod (BMW Isetta)
 The Geeze (Fiat 500)
 P-Nut (Austin Mini)
 Froggy (Citroen 2CV)
 Super Genius (Smart Fourtwo)
 Turtle (VW New Beetle)
 Ricochet (Audi TT)
 Fang (Toyota MRS)
 Road Shark (Honda S2000)
 Portabello (Lotus Elise)
 Street Eagle (RUF CTR2)
 Black Widow (Plymouth Prowler)

Reception

Top Gear: Dare Devil received "mixed or average" reviews according to the review aggregation website Metacritic. GameSpots Ryan Davis wrote that "there is a good deal of potential here, but Top Gear Dare Devils deeply flawed physics engine, lack of gameplay variations, and frame rate issues keep it in the shadow of Crazy Taxi and make it a game that you should avoid." IGN also gave low marks, saying that the game is "an acquired taste and is something that should be rented first before you decide to pick it up." NextGens David Chen wrote that the game was "more a morsel than a meal, but it's perfect as a three-day rental." In Japan, Famitsu gave it a score of 24 out of 40.

Notes

References

External links
 

2000 video games
PlayStation 2 games
PlayStation 2-only games
Kemco games
Top Gear (video game series)
Video games developed in the United States
Video games set in Rome
Video games set in London
Video games set in San Francisco
Video games set in Tokyo
Multiplayer and single-player video games
Papaya Studio games